The canton of La Gâtine is a canton located in the arrondissement of Parthenay, in the department of Deux-Sèvres, in the Nouvelle-Aquitaine region of France. It was created following the French canton reorganisation which came into effect in March 2015. It consists of 38 communes:

Allonne 
Aubigny
Azay-sur-Thouet
Beaulieu-sous-Parthenay
La Boissière-en-Gâtine
Les Châteliers
Clavé
Doux
La Ferrière-en-Parthenay
Fomperron
Les Forges
Gourgé
Les Groseillers
Lhoumois
Mazières-en-Gâtine
Ménigoute
Oroux
La Peyratte 
Pougne-Hérisson 
Pressigny
Reffannes
Le Retail 
Saint-Aubin-le-Cloud 
Saint-Georges-de-Noisné
Saint-Germier
Saint-Lin
Saint-Marc-la-Lande
Saint-Martin-du-Fouilloux
Saint-Pardoux-Soutiers
Saurais
Secondigny 
Thénezay
Vasles
Vausseroux
Vautebis
Vernoux-en-Gâtine 
Verruyes
Vouhé

References

Cantons of Deux-Sèvres